The Commissioner for Tourism heads the Tourism Commission of the Hong Kong Government, which reports to Economic Development Branch of the Commerce and Economic Development Bureau. The Travel Agents Registry is part of the commission.

List of Commissioners for Tourism
Michael Rowse (May 1999–October 2000)
Rebecca Lai  (7 December 2000 - 200?)
Eva Cheng (200?–2007)
Margaret Fong (2007–2009)
Philip Yung (2009–?)
Cathy Chu (2014-2018)
Vivian Sum (Present)

References

External links
 

Tourism, Commissioner of
Lists of political office-holders in Hong Kong
Hong Kong